Sebastian Kneißl (born 13 January 1983) is a German former professional footballer who played as a midfielder and forward.

Club career 
After beginning as a youth player in Germany with KSG Mitlechtern, FC 07 Bensheim and Eintracht Frankfurt, Kneißl signed for English side Chelsea in 2000. He stayed with Chelsea for five years, and although he did not make any league appearances, he spent loan spells in Scotland with Dundee, where he played in 11 league games, scoring one goal, and in Belgium with Westerlo. After leaving Chelsea in 2005 he played for German clubs SV Wacker Burghausen and Fortuna Düsseldorf, before returning to England with AFC Wimbledon in September 2007, where he made one league appearance before leaving in October 2007. He signed for Wivenhoe Town in December 2007, but left after just one league appearance. He next signed for SpVgg Weiden in July 2008, before moving to 1. FC Schweinfurt 05 in January 2009 on another free transfer.

After retiring in October 2013, after playing for SV Heimstetten in the Regionalliga Bayern, Kneißl decided to make a comeback in the tier seven Bezirksliga in 2015–16.

International career 
Kneißl represented Germany at the 2002 UEFA European Under-19 Football Championship, in which the Germany U19 finished second, and at the 2003 FIFA World Youth Championship.

Honours 
Germany U19
 UEFA European Under-19 Football Championship: runner-up 2002

References

External links 
 

1983 births
Living people
People from Bergstraße (district)
Sportspeople from Darmstadt (region)
German footballers
Footballers from Hesse
Association football midfielders
Association football forwards
Germany youth international footballers
Chelsea F.C. players
Dundee F.C. players
K.V.C. Westerlo players
SV Wacker Burghausen players
Fortuna Düsseldorf players
AFC Wimbledon players
Wivenhoe Town F.C. players
1. FC Schweinfurt 05 players
SV Heimstetten players
Scottish Premier League players
Belgian Pro League players
2. Bundesliga players
German expatriate footballers
German expatriate sportspeople in Belgium
Expatriate footballers in Belgium
German expatriate sportspeople in England
Expatriate footballers in England
German expatriate sportspeople in Scotland
Expatriate footballers in Scotland